Sergey Viktorovich Khodos (born 14 July 1986) is a Russian right-handed épée fencer, three-time team European champion, two-time Olympian, and 2021 team Olympic silver medalist. Khodos competed in the 2016 Rio de Janeiro Olympic Games and the 2020 Tokyo Olympic Games.

He first competed for Kazakhstan, winning the team gold medal at the 2006 Junior World Championships, a team bronze medal at the 2006 Asian Games and an individual silver medal. He then switched to Russia, joining the national team in 2010. With them he was team bronze medallist at the 2011 and 2014 European Championships. He placed fourth at the 2010 and 2014 World Championships, also with the team.

Medal record

Olympic Games

World Championship

Asian Championship

European Championship

Grand Prix

References

External links 
 
 
  (archive)
 
 
 

1986 births
Living people
Kazakhstani male épée fencers
Russian male épée fencers
Olympic fencers of Russia
Fencers at the 2016 Summer Olympics
Asian Games medalists in fencing
Asian Games bronze medalists for Kazakhstan
Fencers at the 2006 Asian Games
Medalists at the 2006 Asian Games
European Games medalists in fencing
European Games silver medalists for Russia
Fencers at the 2015 European Games
Universiade gold medalists for Russia
Universiade medalists in fencing
Sportspeople from Oskemen
Medalists at the 2011 Summer Universiade
Fencers at the 2020 Summer Olympics
Medalists at the 2020 Summer Olympics
Olympic medalists in fencing
Olympic silver medalists for the Russian Olympic Committee athletes